Heir-Conditioned is a Warner Bros. Looney Tunes theatrical cartoon short directed by Friz Freleng and written by Warren Foster. The short was released on November 26, 1955, and features Elmer Fudd and Sylvester.

Heir-Conditioned is the second of three Looney Tunes shorts underwritten by the Alfred P. Sloan Foundation (the first being By Word of Mouse).

Plot
The story begins with Sylvester the Cat finding himself the heir of his mistress' vast fortune. While his financial adviser, Elmer Fudd, is urging him to invest his money, Sylvester is frightened he will simply lose his money. Meanwhile, his street cat friends are out to get the money for themselves, but Fudd manages to thwart each attempt, including the one from Johnny, a cat who pretends to be a salesman for a "silver cleaning liquid" of the Hi-Ho Silver Cleaning Company of Walla Walla, Washington. Finally, Fudd manages an extensive lecture on the benefits of good investment on the economy with an educational film to illustrate the point. While Sylvester is not convinced, the cats outside see the film themselves and are persuaded to the point when Sylvester manages to get the money to them, they demand he give it over to Elmer for investment. Defeated, Sylvester gives in and growls to the portrait of his mistress that his life would have been less complicated if she took her money with her.

Voices
Mel Blanc as Sylvester, Charlie the Fast-talking Sales-cat, Additional Cats, Tweety.
Daws Butler as Bernie the Cat
Stan Freberg as Gus the Cat, Additional Cats.
Arthur Q. Bryan as Elmer Fudd

References

1955 films
1955 short films
1955 animated films
1950s educational films
1950s English-language films
1950s Warner Bros. animated short films
American animated short films
Sponsored films
Looney Tunes shorts
Alfred P. Sloan Foundation
Elmer Fudd films
Sylvester the Cat films
Tweety films
Films about inheritances
Short films directed by Friz Freleng
Films scored by Milt Franklyn
Warner Bros. Cartoons animated short films
American educational films